The Wahl Clipper Corporation is an American manufacturer of grooming products. It is headquartered in Sterling, Illinois.

History
Wahl Clipper Corporation was founded due to Leo J. Wahl's patent for an electromagnetic hair clipper in 1919. On February 2, 1921, he purchased majority of the stock of his uncle's manufacturing company which made the clipper, and incorporated the business as Wahl Clipper Corporation. In 1924, Leo Wahl patented a vibrator motor hair clipper.

In 1965 Wahl introduced the first vacuum clipper, which allowed a person's hair to be cut without use of a cape. Following year, Wahl produced the first cordless hair clipper using rechargeable battery technology.

In 1971, it started an electronics division with the first cordless and rechargeable soldering iron. 

In 1975, Wahl released a line of back and foot massagers utilizing the vibrating motor technology used in their hair trimmers.

In 1984, Wahl invented the first cordless consumer beard and moustache trimmer, Groomsman Beard and Mustache Trimmer.

In 1987, Wahl launched Miami Device.

In 1996, Wahl acquired Moser Elektrogerate GmbH.

In 2001, it patented the first vacuuming consumer beard trimmer, the Trim N Vac. Wahl manufactures its clippers and trimmers in its own factories in Sterling, Illinois; parts come from Germany, England, China, and Hungary, while international plants are present in China, England, Australia, Canada, the Netherlands and Japan.

In 2006 Wahl licensed the For Dummies brand from John Wiley & Sons publishing company and launched the Home Hair-cutting for Dummies product line.

Presidents
 Leo J. Wahl
 Warren P. Wahl
 Jack Wahl
 Gregory Wahl

Brands
 Wahl
 Moser
 Lister
 Groom Ease

See also
 Electric razors
 Electric shaving

References

Further reading
 Wahl, John F. (2005). "WAHL," The History of Wahl Clipper Corp.
 Sherrow, Victoria (2023). Encyclopedia of Hair: A Cultural History, 2nd Edition

External links

 

1921 establishments in Illinois
American brands
Companies based in Whiteside County, Illinois
Facial hair
Hairdressing
Manufacturing companies established in 1921
Personal care brands
Shaving